Coed Talon (also spelt "Coed-talon") is a small, formerly industrial village between Leeswood and Treuddyn in Flintshire, Wales. Its name is derived from the Welsh word coed ("wood") and the word talwrn, anglicised to "Talon", meaning a "hillside devoid of trees" or "threshing-floor" (perhaps referring to a wood beneath a bare hillside).

History 
The area, about four miles from the market town of Mold, was primarily agricultural until the nineteenth century, when following the discovery of coal and iron ore seams, an ironworks and a series of collieries were opened. In 1892, a bed of fireclay was discovered and a brickworks was subsequently opened. There was also a silica quarry nearby at Waun y Llyn.

The industries were served by a branch of the London and North Western Railway, who in 1892 introduced a passenger service to Coed Talon, running over part of the Wrexham and Minera Joint Railway to Brymbo in Denbighshire.

The station closed in 1950 and the line to Brymbo was taken out of use shortly afterwards, though goods trains from Mold continued until 1963.

Recent developments 
The village still has a pub called the Railway Inn. The small-scale colliery workings at Coed Talon operated until 1987, and were subsequently worked by the opencast method. A brickworks also continued in operation at Coed Talon until relatively recently.
What happened to The Coed Talon Hotel as I note it’s not mentioned.
The steam train used to pass by Coed Talon CP School in the 1950’s on its way to & from the Silica Works.

References

Villages in Flintshire